Edward "Curly" Thirlwell (November 18, 1905 – December 2, 1985) was an American sound engineer. He has been nominated for two Academy Awards in the category Best Sound.

Selected filmography
 The Godfather (1972) Sound effects re-recordist (uncredited)
 Funny Lady (1975)
 The Buddy Holly Story (1978)

References

External links

1905 births
1985 deaths
American audio engineers
20th-century American engineers